Tortyra caracasiae is a moth of the family Choreutidae. It is known from Costa Rica and Venezuela.

References

Tortyra
Taxa named by Hans Georg Amsel